The 2011 FIA GT1 San Luis round was an auto racing event held at the Potrero de los Funes Circuit, San Luis, Argentina on 4–6 November, and was the final round of the 2011 FIA GT1 World Championship season. It was the FIA GT1 World Championship's second race held in Argentina, a week after the 2010 San Luis round at the  circuit. This event was supported by the TC 2000 Championship, Fiat Linea Competizione and the Argentine Formula Renault Championship.

Background

Michael Krumm and Lucas Luhr went into this weekend as championship leaders in the Drivers Championship, eleven points ahead of Young Driver AMR drivers Darren Turner and Stefan Mücke. The Championship was up for grabs, as far down as sixth place Marc VDS driver Maxime Martin who was on 98 points and could have won the championship by winning the two races thus picking up 33 points and tying with Krumm and Luhr but only if the Germans either did not finish in the points or retired. Martin could winn the championship by picking up a possible six wins to Krumm and Luhr's four. In the Teams Championship, Young Driver AMR overtook JRM in the previous round at Beijing and led by eight points.

Markus Palttala replaced Yann Clairay for this round returning behind the wheel of the No. 10 Belgian Racing Ford GT after racing with the team at Silverstone. Clairay replaced Bertrand Baguette behind the wheel of the No. 41 Marc VDS car. Exim Bank Team China drafted in two new drivers Yelmer Buurman and Francesco Pastorelli for the Argentine round both making their FIA GT1 débuts replacing Ho-Pin Tung and Jeroen den Boer. Ricardo Risatti returned to the championship competing in the No. 40 Marc VDS Ford replacing Marc Hennerici. He made a cameo appearance in the San Luis round last season with Young Driver AMR. Christopher Haase also returns to the championship replacing Benjamin Leuenberger in the No. 47 DKR Lamborghini. The 2010 FIA GT3 champion raced for Reiter Engineering in the previous season.

Qualifying

Qualifying result
For qualifying, Driver 1 participates in the first and third sessions while Driver 2 participates in only the second session.  The fastest lap for each session is indicated with bold.

Races

Qualifying Race
The Qualifying race saw Michael Krumm and Lucas Luhr win the Drivers Championship with the Championship Race still to run. They finished in second place behind the No. 11 Corvette with nearest rivals Turner and Mücke not starting the race due to an accident in pre-qualifying. The Corvette pairing of Buurman and Pastorelli won on their début outing in the GT1 World Championship. The Teams Championship was still up for grabs going into the Championship Race with Young Driver AMR leading over JRM by three points.

Race result

Championship Race
The Championship Race immediately started in chaos with a 5-way crash as soon as the race went underway. One of the cars involved was the No. 23 car which was the Drivers Championship-winning car and also the first and only retirement for that car in the season. Other cars involved were the two All-Inkl Lamborghini's, the No. 48 DKR Lamborghini and the No. 21 Sumo Power Nissan. The Championship Race was won by Qualifying Race winners Buurman and Pastorelli and was the first and only Championship Race win for the Corvette brand. JR Motorsports overtook Young Driver AMR in the Teams Championship by one point but the Championship was won by Hexis AMR who grabbed up 25 points in the Championship race and overtook the two teams. Hexis won the Teams Championship by three points.

Race result

References

External links
 San Luis GT1 Race in Argentina – FIA GT1 World Championship

San Luis
FIA GT1
FIA GT1 San Luis round